Hesperophanini is a tribe of beetles in the subfamily Cerambycinae, containing the following genera:

 Alastos
 Anatinomma
 Anoplomerus
 Austranoplium
 Austrophanes
 Brittonella
 Brothylus
 Cacophrissus
 Catoptronotum
 Cetimaique
 Corupella
 Dubiefostola
 Eucrossus
 Eusapia
 Grammicosum
 Haplidus
 Hesperanoplium
 Hespereburia
 Hesperophanes
 Hesperophanoschema
 Hesperophymatus
 Heteraneflus
 Limernaea
 Liosteburia
 Liostola
 Malobidion
 Meganoplium
 Megosmidus
 Nesophanes
 Ochrus
 Oraphanes
 Osmidus
 Paracorupella
 Paraliostola
 Parandraceps
 Perilasius
 Phrynocris
 Phymatioderus
 Potiaete
 Stromatium
 Thecladoris
 Tippmannia
 Trichoferus
 Tylonotus
 Vilchesia
 Xeranoplium
 Zamodes (Presumed extinct)
 Zathecus

References

 
Cerambycinae